The Zlast is a left tributary of the river Amaradia in Romania. It flows into the Amaradia close to its confluence with the Jiu, near Iași-Gorj.

References

Rivers of Romania
Rivers of Gorj County